Friedrich Ludwig von Payer (12 June 1847 – 14 July 1931) was a German lawyer, liberal politician and the vice-chancellor of German Empire during the last year of World War I. He was born in Tübingen and was educated at the seminary at Blaubeuren, returning to his home town to study law in 1865. Having completed his university education, he worked as a lawyer in Stuttgart and was first elected to the Reichstag in 1877. He reached the height of his political career during the First World War during which he advocated a negotiated peace with the allied powers and was appointed vice-chancellor. After the war, he was chairman of the German Democratic Party and remained a member of the new Weimar Reichstag until 6 June 1920.
Payer married Alwine Schöninger.

References 
Günther Bradler, Politische Unterhaltungen Friedrich Payers mit Theodor Heuss. Ein Fund aus dem Hauptstaatsarchiv Stuttgart, in: Zeitschrift für Württembergische Landesgeschichte (ZWLG), Jahrgang 1973, Seiten 161-192.
Günther Bradler, Friedrich Payer. Autobiographische Aufzeichnungen und Dokumente, Göppingen 1974.
Reinhold A. Helmut Franz, Das Problem der konstitutionellen Parlamentarisierung bei Conrad Haußmann und Friedrich von Payer, Göppingen 1977.
Friedrich Payer zum Gedenken, Reutlingen 1997.

External links 

 

1847 births
1931 deaths
People from Tübingen
People from the Kingdom of Württemberg
German Lutherans
German People's Party (1868) politicians
Progressive People's Party (Germany) politicians
German Democratic Party politicians
Vice-Chancellors of Germany
Members of the 3rd Reichstag of the German Empire
Members of the 5th Reichstag of the German Empire
Members of the 6th Reichstag of the German Empire
Members of the 8th Reichstag of the German Empire
Members of the 9th Reichstag of the German Empire
Members of the 10th Reichstag of the German Empire
Members of the 11th Reichstag of the German Empire
Members of the 12th Reichstag of the German Empire
Members of the 13th Reichstag of the German Empire
Members of the Weimar National Assembly
University of Tübingen alumni